Sherlock is a town and locality in the Australian state of South Australia. It is on the Pinnaroo railway line and Mallee Highway.

History
The town was surveyed in May 1907. The Sherlock Baptist Church opened in 1911, and was the first stone building erected along the Pinnaroo railway line.

References

Towns in South Australia